Asurgarh is an archaeological site in the Kalahandi district of Odisha, India. Asurgarh is one of the sites which has its beginning in around 8th-9th century BC and emerged as one of the early urban fortified settlements in the region and it is older than Sisupalgarh.

Description

It is almost rectangular in shape, having four gates piercing the surrounding mammoth wall made of brick, rubble and earth. After the wall, a wide and deep moat girdles the fort on three sides respectively, the north, south and east. The fort area measures 24.29 hectares of land. On the west of the fort, the river Sandol flows close to the western rampart towards north to meet the river Utei, a tributary of the Tel, at a distance of about 3 km from the fort site.

Close to the eastern ditch, the builders of the fort excavated a huge water reservoir measuring 200 acres of land. It is popularly known as Asursagar. It has been pointed out that the water of the reservoir could be trained into the ditch of the fort through two sluices gate. On the southwest corner of the fort, another small tank was dug, which is known today as Radhasagar. The Habitation zone of the inhabitants is documented towards the south and north of the fort immediately after the fortified wall. Lowe town or habitation area is further superimposed by another mud wall within 100 hectares radius at each settlement zone, the mud wall has a single gate in the middle.

Archaeologists have unearthed artefacts believed to be 2,300-year-old while carrying out excavation at the Asurgarh Fort in Odisha’s Kalahandi district. DB Garnayak, Archaeological Survey of India, says Asurgarh is one of the sites which has its beginning in around 8th-9th century BC and emerged as one of the early urban fortified settlements in the region by the efforts of tribal and non-tribal inhabitants of the region.
Lokesh Durga, Department of History of Delhi University, says Asurgarh settlement is older than Sisupalgarh and the first Urbanization process in Odisha started from Asurgarh.

References

Further reading
Paul Yule, Early Historic Sites in Orissa (Delhi 2006) 

Kalahandi district
Ancient Indian cities
Archaeological sites in Odisha
Archaeological monuments in Odisha